On Black Sisters Street is a 2011 translated novel by Nigerian author Chika Unigwe. It is her second novel, which was originally published as Fata Morgana, in Dutch in 2008 and subsequently released in English as On Black Sisters' Street. On Black Sisters' Street is about African prostitutes living and working in Belgium. On Black Sisters' Street won the 2012 Nigeria Prize for Literature; valued at $100,000 it is Africa's largest literary prize.

Reference

Postcolonial novels
2008 Nigerian novels
Novels set in Belgium
Random House books
Parrésia Publishers books